The 46th World Science Fiction Convention (Worldcon), also known as Nolacon II, was held on 1–5 September 1988 at the Marriott, Sheraton, and International Hotels, and the New Orleans Municipal Auditorium in New Orleans, Louisiana, United States.

The chairman was John H. Guidry.

Participants 

Attendance was approximately 5,300.

Guests of Honor 

 Donald A. Wollheim (pro)
 Roger Sims (fan)
 Mike Resnick (toastmaster)

Awards

1988 Hugo Awards 

 Best Novel: The Uplift War by David Brin
 Best Novella: "Eye for Eye" by Orson Scott Card
 Best Novelette: "Buffalo Gals, Won't You Come Out Tonight" by Ursula K. Le Guin
 Best Short Story: "Why I Left Harry's All-Night Hamburgers" by Lawrence Watt-Evans
 Best Non-Fiction Book: Michael Whelan's Works of Wonder by Michael Whelan
 Other Forms: Watchmen by Alan Moore and Dave Gibbons
 Best Dramatic Presentation: The Princess Bride
 Best Professional Editor: Gardner Dozois
 Best Professional Artist: Michael Whelan
 Best Semiprozine: Locus, edited by Charles N. Brown
 Best Fanzine: Texas SF Inquirer, edited by Pat Mueller
 Best Fan Writer: Mike Glyer
 Best Fan Artist: Brad Foster

Other awards 

 Special Award: The SF Oral History Association
 John W. Campbell Award for Best New Writer: Judith Moffett

See also 

 Hugo Award
 Science fiction
 Speculative fiction
 World Science Fiction Society
 Worldcon

References

External links 

 NESFA.org: The Long List
 NESFA.org: 1988 convention notes 

1988 conferences
1988 in Louisiana
1988 in the United States
20th century in New Orleans
Science fiction conventions in the United States
Worldcon